Mo' Rock is an album by organist Baby Face Willette recorded in 1964 and released on the Argo label.

Reception

Allmusic awarded the album 3 stars stating "Overall, Mo' Rock isn't quite up to the level of Willette's Blue Note sessions, but it's still a very respectable outing, and given the unfortunate skimpiness of his discography, his fans should find it rewarding enough to seek out".

Track listing 
All compositions by Roosevelt "Baby Face" Willette except where noted
 "Mo-Roc" - 4:51   
 "Bantu Penda" - 5:19   
 "Dad's Theme" - 5:30   
 "But Not for Me" (George Gershwin, Ira Gershwin) - 4:12   
 "Misty" (Johnny Burke, Erroll Garner) - 3:58   
 "Unseen and Unknown" - 4:19   
 "Zip Five" - 5:19   
 "Sight in Darkness" - 5:09

Personnel 
Baby Face Willette - organ
Ben White - guitar
Eugene Bass - drums

References 

1964 albums
Argo Records albums
Baby Face Willette albums
Albums produced by Esmond Edwards